Daniel Goossens, born May 16, 1954, in Salon-de-Provence, Bouches-du-Rhône is a French comics artist.

Biography
Goossens began his career in the magazine Pionniers. After a short spell at Pilote magazine, he began contributing to the monthly magazine Fluide Glacial in 1977, and became one of its authors.  Later, his work also appeared in Le Petit Psikopat Illustré (ancestor of current Psikopat) and Rigolo.

Apart from his work with comic strips, Daniel Goossens is a lecturer and researcher in artificial intelligence at the University of Paris VIII.

Goossens was awarded the Grand Prix de la ville d'Angoulême in 1997.

Style
Goossens' comics are built on a clash between semi-realistic art and surreal content. He relishes regurgitating clichéd situations from literature, film and television, and introducing odd twists. (His classic Route vers l'enfer book is a war film pastiche starring Father Christmas.) Particular attention is paid to dialogues, which often drag on past all logic, and include much stuttering, mumbling and other noises rendered phonetically. Most of his comic books are collections of short stories, with a loose common thread. Like his mentor Gotlib, Goossens has also often used a mock-encyclopedic tone. Goossens' inquiry on absurd does not refrain from astonishing scenes that some may find disturbing - such as a gang of children stoning Father Christmas, or an infant Albert Einstein tossing an eye out of a bully at the kindergarten, or a mother requiring consulting the doctor for basic practical wisdom until she finally brings her baby's skeleton.

References

1954 births
Living people
People from Salon-de-Provence
French cartoonists
Artificial intelligence researchers
Grand Prix de la ville d'Angoulême winners